The Polish Catholic Mission, (PMK) is a permanent Catholic chaplaincy for migrant Poles. It operates in a number of countries under the direction of the Polish Episcopal Conference.

England and Wales

History
The origins of pastoral care for displaced Poles in the British Isles go back to the 19th century historical insurrections that took place on the former territory of the Commonwealth of Two Nations in 1831, 1848, 1863 and 1905.

One of the first chaplains was fr. Emeryk Podolski, who led church services for Poles in a chapel on Sutton Street in London's Soho district. In 1864 through the efforts of general Zamoyski and Cardinal Wiseman, Rev. Chwaliszewski was invited to come to London and lead services in the Polish chapel at St. Peter's Hatton Garden. The Polish chaplaincy was placed on a permanent footing in 1894 by Cardinal Vaughan, the then Archbishop of Westminster. The nucleus of the mission was formed by Bl. Franciszka Siedliska, founder of the Congregation of the Holy Family of Nazareth and its spiritual director, rev. Lechert CR . With Mother Siedliska came two sisters who started a first primary school. From then on Polish services were regularly held in a chapel first in Globe Street, then in Cambridge Heath Road in Bethnal Green in the East End of London.

After World War I, the Polish chaplaincy was located in the rented Polish church in Mercer Street in North London. In 1928 the local authority condemned the church building as unsafe, due to its poor structural condition. That same year the parish was visited by cardinal Aleksander Kakowski in the company of bishop Przeździeński from the diocese of Siedlce and Polish ambassador, Konstanty Skirmunt. After an extended search, it was decided to purchase a church building for £4,000 from the Swedenborg Society in Devonia Road, Islington. The property with its outbuildings lent itself for ecclesiastical use, as a mission centre and with space for a Polish Saturday school. Cardinal Bourne of Westminster, helped the mission with a £1000 loan for refurbishment. It became the first Polish-owned ecclesiastical building in the British Isles. It was consecrated on 30 October 1930 by cardinal August Hlond, primate of Poland in the presence of cardinal Bourne. In 1938 rev. Władysław Staniszewski became chaplain to the mission,  who until then had been Chef de Cabinet of the Polish primate, and who had volunteered to come to England for three years. As he left for London, cardinal Hlond bid him farewell with these words:

Following this great war, that we foresee, it is most likely that the Polish colony over there will swell and if we succeed in maintaining the legation till then, it may turn out to be fortuitous.

As it turned out, during the Second world war, the mission had its hands full. After the war, the pastoral task extended to almost 200,000 displaced people - mainly soldiers. Fortunately, among them were also 120 Military chaplains and priests. In 1948, following a visit to Poland the previous year for talks with cardinal Hlond, and after consulting with the Catholic episcopate of England and Wales, Cardinal Griffin nominated the rector of the Polish Catholic Mission, rev. Staniszewski as Vicar delegate for civilian Poles in England and Wales, with the powers of an Ordinariate. Around this time Archbishop Hlond had nominated Bishop Józef Gawlina, also a Divisional general and based in Rome, to be responsible overall for the Polish diaspora. Between them, this enabled the then rector in England to engage priests and organize regular pastoral care across 18 dioceses in England and Wales. At the same time, a polish Catholic press came into being, including titles, like: Gazeta Niedzielna, Życie, Czyn Katolicki, Sodalis Marianus and Marianum w służbie. In time, two secondary boarding schools were opened: "Holy Family of Nazareth Convent School" for girls in Pitsford, Northamptonshire (1947-1984) run by the Sisters of Congregation of the Holy Family of Nazareth, and "Divine Mercy College" for boys in Fawley Court (1953-1986), near Henley-on-Thames, run by the Marian Fathers.

On the pastoral front, the temporary Polish parish hosted in Central London by the fathers of Brompton Oratory was able to be moved westward in 1962 to the newly acquired building from the vacating Scottish Presbyterians. It became St Andrew Bobola church in Shepherd's Bush, the second Polish owned church in London since 1930. The Mission was boosted by the integration of male religious orders, the Polish Jesuits in Willesden north-west London, the Marian fathers in Ealing and Fawley, and the Society of Christ Fathers, dedicated to minister to the Polish diaspora abroad who run a parish in Putney.

In the next period, the Polish Catholic Mission had taken possession of 30 church buildings, 12 chapels, 39 parsonages and 55 parish halls. In the 1980s, Poles in Britain expanded due to a wave of migration following the imposition of Martial law in Poland in 1981.

21st century
The next wave of immigrants to the United Kingdom occurred after Poland's accession to the European Union and the opening of the UK job market to Poles, among other Central Europeans. Churches are full on Sundays, despite the estimate that 10% of Poles actually attend services regularly. The Polish Catholic Mission in England and Wales has charitable status

List of PCM Rectors in the UK
Rectors
 Antoni Lechert, CR 1894 – 1902
 Henryk Cichocki, CR 1902 – 1903
 Grzegorz Domański, SDB 1904 – 1906
 Piotr Bujara, SDB 1906 – 1913
 Jan Symior, SDB 1913 – 1921
 Józef Wroński, SDB 1921 – 1926
 Teodor Cichos, SDB 1926 – 1938

Vicars Delegate
 Monsignor Władysław Staniszewski (Protonotary Apostolic) 1938 – 1974Staniszewski's role in organizing the Polish Millennium in London (1966) http://www.tydzien.co.uk/artykuly/2016/09/04/millenium-na-emigracji-londyn-1966/
 Monsignor Karol Zieliński 1974 – 1991
 Monsignor Stanisław Świerczyński (Protonotary Apostolic) 1991 – 2002
 Monsignor Tadeusz Kukla 2002 – 2010
 Monsignor Stefan Wylężek 2010 –
('Protonotary Apostolic' is the highest non-episcopal title and in polish is referred to as 'infułat' a reference to the short mitre that a priest with such a title was entitled to wear in certain settings.)

Scotland
A separate Polish mission operates throughout Scotland.

France

The oldest of all PMK European legations operates from its centre in Paris, already established in the 1830s by such national luminaries as Aleksander Jełowicki its first rector, Adam Mickiewicz, or Juliusz Słowacki all of whom were obliged to emigrate to France after the 1831 November Uprising. The hub of the mission is the parish of Notre-Dame-de-l'Assomption, Paris, dedicated to the Assumption of the Blessed Virgin Mary which collaborates with the Polish Adam Mickiewicz school in Paris, next to the Polish Embassy. As well as religious instruction, the parish offers Polish lessons for children and young people and various levels of French language teaching. There are well over a dozen Polish parishes and chapels in Paris that celebrate Mass in Polish, or in the event that there are Francophone visitors, in both Polish and French language.

Every year Poles join a special Pilgrimage to the celebrated Sacre-Coeur basilica in Montmartre. While Polish burials are scattered in cemeteries across France, a special place is the cemetery des Champeaux de Montmorency, 15km north of Paris in the Val-d'Oise, by the spa of Enghien-les-Bains, much favoured by 19th-c. Poles. There are almost 300 Polish graves and a Memorial Wall, covering 20th-century events.

Monsignor Stanisław Jeż was PMK rector in France from 1985 to 2015. Since 2015 the role is filled by rev. Bogusław Brzyś.

Germany
The Mission began operating in Germany in 1945 in many Polish communities. It concentrates on organizing services in Polish and collaborates with Polish schools across the country. The Mission owns a social centre, Dom Concordia and publishes a review, Nasze Słowo - "Our Word".

Sweden

In Stockholm the Mission is called "Polska Katolska Missionen”. The chaplaincy team rents a protestant church where services are held on Sundays and Fridays. The Mission does outreach to areas beyond the capital. In Malmö the mission operates in the Catholic churches of Maria and Rosengard, with services every Sunday. In Göteborg a Mass is celebrated every Sunday in the "Kristus Konungens kyrka".

United States
Several religious orders run parishes across the country, especially:
 The Society of Christ Fathers (SCH) dedicated to the ministry for Poles Abroad
 The Society of the Divine Word (SVD) at the John Paul II Center in Yorba Linda, California
 Jesuit Fathers in Polish pastoral centres.
The Roman Catholic Diocese of Memphis oversees the Polish Catholic Mission of Memphis, TN (Polska Misja Katolicka w Memphis, TN) for Polish immigrants living in the Memphis, Tennessee area.

See also
 Catholic Church in England and Wales
 Poles in the United Kingdom
 Bernard Łubieński
 Polish diaspora

References

External links
 PMK Anglia i Walia - In England and Wales 
 PMK Francja - in France
 PMK Niemcy - in Germany
 PMK Szwecja - in Sweden

 
Poland–United Kingdom relations
United Kingdom
United Kingdom